Zlaté Klasy is a village and municipality in the Dunajská Streda District in the Trnava Region of south-west Slovakia.

Component villages

Geography
The municipality lies at an altitude of 122 metres and covers an area of 11.962 km².

History

In the 9th century, the territory of Zlaté Klasy became part of the Kingdom of Hungary. From the end of the 9th century until the end of World War I, the village was part of Hungary and fell within the Somorja district of Pozsony County.

The village was first recorded in 1239 by its Hungarian name as "Mogor". In 1281, it was mentioned as "Magari", while in 1354 as "Egyhazasmagyary". The village first belonged to the Pozsony Castle, later it became the possession of noble families. Since the 17th century, much of the village was the property the Poor Clares and the order managed several of its estates from this village.

After the Austro-Hungarian army disintegrated in November 1918, Czechoslovak troops occupied the area. After the Treaty of Trianon of 1920, the village became officially part of Czechoslovakia. In November 1938, the First Vienna Award granted the area to Hungary and it was held by Hungary until 1945. After Soviet occupation in 1945, Czechoslovak administration returned and the village became officially part of Czechoslovakia in 1947. The present-day municipality was formed in 1960 by the unification of the component villages.

Demography 
In 1910, the village had 1325, for the most part, Hungarian inhabitants. At the 2001 Census the recorded population of the village was 3475 while an end-2008 estimate by the Statistical Office was 3529. As of 2001, 92.67% of its population were Hungarians while 7.09% were Slovaks.

Roman Catholicism is the majority religion of the village, its adherents numbering 94.01% of the total population.

Twinnings
The village is twinned with
 Ecser, Hungary

References 

Villages and municipalities in Dunajská Streda District
Hungarian communities in Slovakia